Dương Thủy is a rural commune (xã) in the Lệ Thủy District, Quảng Bình Province, North Central Coast region of Vietnam. This commune borders communes of Mỹ Thủy and Tân Thủy.

This is an agricultural commune.

Communes of Quảng Bình province